Scott Vogel (born April 5, 1973) is an American vocalist. He is the lead singer and founding member of hardcore punk band Terror, and formerly of Buried Alive and World Be Free.

Career
Vogel was born in Buffalo, New York.

In the early 1990s, he played in the band Slugfest; in the mid 1990s in the band Despair; and in the late 1990s in the band Buried Alive. He also played drums in Against All Hope and Fadeaway.

Terror was formed in 2002 and are currently signed to Pure Noise. They have released a total of seven studio albums, along with a number of live albums, EPs, and other recordings. Sink to the Hell was released in December 2020.

World Be Free, currently signed to Revelation Records, is a newer project which began in 2014 and features Vogel on vocals, along with guitarist Joe Garlipp (Despair), guitarist Andrew Kline (Strife), drummer Sammy Siegler (Judge/CIV/Rival Schools), and bassist Alex Barreto (Chain of Strength/Excel). The band's debut full length titled The Anti-Circle was released on February 6, 2016.

References

External links 
 Scott Vogel on Instagram
 Terror on Facebook

1973 births
Living people
21st-century American singers
American male singers
American rock singers
Hardcore punk musicians
Musicians from Buffalo, New York
Terror (band) members